The CDLSE (Clearance Divers' Life Support Equipment) is made by Divex in Aberdeen, Scotland.
It is an electronic closed circuit rebreather designed to be silent and non-magnetic. It allows diving to  using air as diluent, or up to  using
heliox and trimix.

Some sources describe it as a "Stealth Clearance Divers Life Support Equipment".

, the Royal Navy plan to use it to replace the Carleton CDBA. It was introduced into service in 2010. Full Operation Capability was reached on 23 July 2011.

It is also used by the French Navy, Royal Australian Navy and Republic of Singapore Navy.

Its absorbent is designed to last four to six hours.
Designed to work with either a bite mouthpiece and standard half mask, or with Divex's proprietary Dual Mode Mask.

See also

References

External links
Images and information

Rebreathers
Scottish brands